C. nepalensis may refer to:

 Callistomimus nepalensis, a ground beetle
 Calocheiridius nepalensis, a book scorpion
 Canna nepalensis, a perennial plant
 Cardamine nepalensis, a mustard flower
 Chamaerops nepalensis, an Asian plant
 Cheiroseius nepalensis, a mite with a single pair of spiracles positioned laterally on the body
 Chlaenius nepalensis, a ground beetle
 Chorthippus nepalensis, an acridid grasshopper
 Cissampelos nepalensis, a flowering plant
 Codonopsis nepalensis, a plant endemic to East Asia
 Cordyceps nepalensis, a sac fungus
 Coriaria nepalensis, a shrub with yellow flowers
 Cotachena nepalensis, a grass moth
 Cotoneaster nepalensis, a plant native to the Palaearctic region
 Craspedophorus nepalensis, a ground beetle
 Cupressus nepalensis, a southern Asian cypress
 Cyananthus nepalensis, a Himalayan herb
 Cychropsis nepalensis, a ground beetle
 Cyrtodactylus nepalensis, a bent-toed gecko